Uranium pentafluoride is the inorganic compound with the chemical formula UF5.  It is a pale yellow paramagnetic solid.  The compound has attracted interest because it is related to uranium hexafluoride, which is widely used to produce uranium fuel. It crystallizes in two polymorphs, called α- and β-UF5.

Synthesis and structure
Uranium pentafluoride is an intermediate in the conversion of uranium tetrafluoride to volatile UF6:
2UF4  +  F2  →  2UF5
2UF5  +  F2  →  2UF6

It can be produced by reduction of the hexafluoride with carbon monoxide at elevated temperatures. 
 2UF6  +  CO   →  2UF5  +  COF2
Other reducing agents have been examined.

The α form is a linear coordination polymer consisting of chains of octahedral uranium centers in which one of the five fluoride anion forms a bridge to the next uranium atom.  The structure is reminiscent of that for vanadium pentafluoride.

In the β form, the uranium centers adopt a square antiprismatic structure. The β polymorph gradually converts to α at 130 °C.

Monomeric UF5
Of theoretical interest, molecular UF5 can be generated as a transient monomer by UV-photolysis of uranium hexafluoride. It is thought to adopt a square pyramidal geometry.

References

Uranium(V) compounds
Nuclear materials
Fluorides
Actinide halides
Inorganic polymers
Coordination polymers